Cairnsichthys is a genus of rainbowfishes from the subfamily Melanotaeniinae. The genus is endemic to freshwater streams in eastern Queensland in north eastern Australia. The genus was designated as a monotypic genus in 1928 by John T. Nichols and Henry C. Raven but in 2018 a second species was assigned to the genus.<ref name = FofA>{{cite web | url = http://fishesofaustralia.net.au/home/genus/247 | title= Cairnsichthys | accessdate = 6 July 2019 | publisher = Museums Victoria | work = Fishes of Australia}}</ref>

SpeciesCairnsichthys bitaeniatus Allen, Hammer & Raadik, 2018 - Daintree rainbowfishCairnsichthys rhombosomoides (Nichols & Raven, 1928) - Cairns rainbowfish

Etymology
The genus is named after the Australian city of Cairns with the suffix ichthys'' which is Greek for "fish".

References

 
Melanotaeniinae
 
Far North Queensland
Ray-finned fish genera